Matthieu Lussiana (born 8 September 1988) is a French motorcycle racer. He currently competes in wildcards in the Superbike World Championship aboard a BMW S1000RR.

Career statistics

Grand Prix motorcycle racing

By season

Races by year
(key)

Superbike World Championship

Races by year

References

External links

1988 births
Living people
French motorcycle racers
125cc World Championship riders
Superbike World Championship riders
FIM Superstock 1000 Cup riders